Jale Vakaloloma (born 10 August 1996) is a Fijian rugby union player who was last signed for the Glasgow Warriors in the Pro14 competition. His position of choice is Blindside flanker.

Rugby Union career

Amateur career

Vakaloloma played for Easts in Australia.

Professional career

He also represented Brisbane City in the 2018 National Rugby Championship.

He signed for Glasgow Warriors on 18 July 2019.

He played for two sides in Scotland's professional Super 6 league in 2020 on his return from shoulder injury:- Boroughmuir Bears and Stirling County.

On 1 October 2020 it was announced that he had been released by Glasgow Warriors.

International career

He was called up and played 3 matches from the bench for Fiji 'A' in 2018 and is thus tied to Fiji.

He has been called up to the Fiji world cup training squad for 2019.

References 

Fijian rugby union players
Living people
Rugby union flankers
Glasgow Warriors players
1996 births
Boroughmuir RFC players
Stirling County RFC players
Rugby union locks
Brisbane City (rugby union) players
San Diego Legion players